Westfall is an unincorporated community in Malheur County, Oregon, United States. Westfall has a post office with ZIP code 97920.

History
Westfall was founded by Levi Westfall in 1870.

The Moses and Mary Hart Stone House and Ranch Complex, constructed in the vicinity of Westfall in 1898, is on the National Register of Historic Places.

Climate
According to the Köppen Climate Classification system, Westfall has a semi-arid climate, abbreviated "BSk" on climate maps.

References

1870 establishments in Oregon
Populated places established in 1870
Former populated places in Malheur County, Oregon
Ghost towns in Oregon
Unincorporated communities in Malheur County, Oregon
Unincorporated communities in Oregon